The Emirate of Afghanistan was an unrecognized state ruled by the Saqqawists that existed from January to October 1929. Habibullāh Kalakāni became the state's only emir on 18 January 1929. After the fall of Kalakāni on 13 October 1929, the Emirate ended.

Their rule over Afghanistan is known in the history of Afghanistan as the Saqqawist period.

History

Administrative divisions

Government 
Once in power, the Saqqawists abolished conscription and taxation, and closed down schools.

Officeholders 
After taking over Kabul, Kalakāni appointed a number of people into office, including:

 Shayr Jan, former cavalry commander, as Minister of Court.
 Ata al-Haqq as foreign minister.
 Abd al-Ghafur Khan, son of Muhammad Shah Tarabi of the Safi tribe, as Minister of the interior.
 Malik Muhsin as governor-general of the Central Province.
 Sayyid Husayn as Minister of Defense.
 Purdil Khan as field marshal of the Army.
 Abd al-Wakil Khan as field marshal of the Army alongside Purdil Khan.
 Hamid Allah as "honorary sardar".
 Sayyid Muhammad as commander of the Arg.
 Mirza Mujtaba Khan as minister of finance.
 Muhammad Mahfuz as war minister.
 Kaka Muhsin of the Kacharlu clan as governor of Hazarahjat (centered on Bihsud).
 Muhammad Karim Khan as governor of Ghazni.
 Khwajah Mir Alam as governor of Mazar-i-Sharif.
 Ghulam Muhammad Khan as governor of Tagab.
 Chighil Khan as governor of Charikar.
 Nadir Ali as governor of Jaghori and Malistan.

Freedom of movement 
On 9 May 1929, Kalakāni passed a decree in Kabul which forbade citizens of Kabul from moving out of the city without permission, even into the government-controlled Bandar-i Arghandah, Charasya, Bini Hisar, Butkhak, Kutal-i Pay Manar, Kutal-i Khayr Khanah, Maydan, Jalriz, Logar, Khurd Kabul, Tangi Gharu or Dih Sabz.

Economy 
For a while, Kalakāni relied on the royal treasury to pay his army, without levying taxes. However, when the treasury ran out, taxation was reinstated in order to cover the expenses of his army. Revenue was also collected by forcing wealthy Tajik merchants to contribute to his treasury.

Military 

The Saqqawists maintained a military during their period of control. On 14 April 1929, Fayz Muhammad estimated the Saqqawists to number 20,000.

Culture 
The Saqqawist government celebrated Afghan Independence Day for five days (instead of the usual eight) starting on 19 August 1929. Kalakani spent 60,000 Afghan rupees on the celebrations, and hoped he could use the occasion to try to win over the Afghan populace. Kalakani gave a speech on 19 August – the contents of the speech are unknown, but Fayz Muhammed remarked that Kalakani "stood there telling lie after lie about the way things really were."

International relations 
Despite taking control of Kabul, The Saqqawist government of Afghanistan was unable to obtain any diplomatic recognition. Nonetheless, the Saqqawists allied themselves with the Basmachi movement, allowing them to operate in Northern Afghanistan. and revoking the "Pact of Neutrality and Non-Aggression" that Afghanistan had signed with the Soviet Union following the end of the Urtatagai conflict, which obligated Afghanistan to restrain Basmachi border raids.

References 

Former political entities in Afghanistan
Modern history of Afghanistan
Former countries in South Asia
Former countries in Central Asia
Former countries of the interwar period
Former emirates
States and territories established in 1929
States and territories disestablished in 1929
1929 establishments in Afghanistan
1929 disestablishments in Afghanistan
Emirate of Afghanistan
Afghan Civil War (1928–1929)